The Drainie carved stones are a collection of 32 Pictish stones originating from the important early medieval monastic settlement of Kinneddar on the outskirts of the modern town of Lossiemouth in Moray, Scotland. Despite their name the majority were discovered at Kinneddar - the location of the manse of the parish of Drainie from which they take their name - rather than the separate settlement of Drainie which lay several miles to the west.

The 32 stone fragments probably represent the remains of ten cross-slabs, three free-standing crosses and at least eight panels from stone shrine chests. Some of the sculpture is unfinished showing that it was produced on-site at Kinneddar.

References

Pictish stones